The Vigil Stakes is a thoroughbred horse race run annually at Woodbine Racetrack in Toronto, Ontario, Canada. It is a Grade III sprint race open to horses aged three and older with a purse of Can$150,000. It is currently run in late July over a distance of 6 furlongs on Woodbine's Tapeta (synthetic dirt) surface.

Inaugurated as the Vigil Handicap, it was first run in 1956 at Fort Erie Race Track where it remained until 1980. Since inception it has been contested at various distances:
 5.5 furlongs :1956-1958 
 6 furlongs: 1959
 6.5 furlongs: 1960
  miles (8.5 furlongs): 1961-1979
 7 furlongs: 1980–2017
6 furlongs: 2018 - present

Records
Speed  record: 
 1:08.06 - Pink Lloyd (2020) (at current distance of 6 furlongs)
 1:20.07 - Hollywood Hit (2009) (at distance of 7 furlongs)

Most wins:
 4 - Pink Lloyd (2017, 2018, 2019, 2020)

Most wins by an owner:
 4 - Gardiner Farm (1969, 1970, 1973, 1974)
 4 - Entourage Stable (2017, 2018, 2019, 2020)

Most wins by a jockey:
 5 - Robin Platts (1969, 1974, 1976, 1981, 1987)

Most wins by a trainer:
 6 - Lou Cavalaris, Jr. (1964, 1966, 1969, 1970, 1973, 1974)

Winners

 † In 1979, Coverack finished first but was disqualified and set back to third.

See also
 List of Canadian flat horse races

References

 The Vigil Stakes at Pedigree Query
 The 2009 Vigil Stakes at Thoroughbred Times

Graded stakes races in Canada
Recurring sporting events established in 1956
Woodbine Racetrack
Sport in Toronto